A Dissertation Concerning the Nature of True Virtue is a work by American Christian reformer, theologian, author and, pastor Jonathan Edwards originally published posthumously in 1765. The work was published jointly with A Dissertation Concerning the End for Which God Created the World.

Synopsis
In Virtue, Edwards describes his views on the different levels of virtue, specifically "common morality" and "true (saving) virtue." God, Edwards argues, had in mind as the end for his creation of the world His own glory and not human happiness. Thus, true virtue does not arise from self-love or from any earth-bound selflessness (these were two common views at the time) but from a desire to see God's glory displayed above all. Love of self, family, or nation is good only to the extent that it magnifies the glory of God.

History and impact
The Nature of True Virtue, and its companion work, A Dissertation Concerning the End for Which God Created the World, are still popular works today. Modern theologian John Piper, who extensively studied the works of Edwards while at seminary, credits the work with awakening in him "a deep longing to be a good man."

See also

 The Freedom of the Will
 Religious Affections

References

External links
 Complete text of The Nature of True Virtue
 "The Nature of True Virtue", lightly edited for easier reading
 

1765 books
18th-century Christian texts
Calvinist texts
Christian theology books
Works published posthumously